Mujahideen, or Mujahidin, is the plural form of mujahid, an Arabic term that broadly refers to people who engage in jihad, interpreted in a jurisprudence of Islam as the fight on behalf of God, religion or the community (ummah).

The widespread use of the word in English began with reference to the guerrilla-type militant groups led by the Islamist Afghan fighters in the Soviet–Afghan War (see Afghan mujahideen). The term now extends to other jihadist groups in various countries such as Myanmar (Burma), Cyprus, and the Philippines.

Early history

In its roots, the Arabic word mujahideen refers to any person performing jihad. In its post-classical meaning, jihad refers to an act that is spiritually comparable in reward to promoting Islam during the early 600s CE. These acts could be as simple as sharing a considerable amount of one's income with the poor.

Modern Western definition
The modern term of mujahideen referring to spiritual Muslim warriors originates in the 19th century, when the term became increasingly identified with the militant Islamic revivalist movement of Syed Ahmad Barelvi, whose self-styled mujāhidīn fought both Sikh expansion and Company rule in India. The root of Barelvi's ideas dated back to 1829, when he came back to the village of Sitana from a pilgrimage to the city of Mecca and began preaching war against the "infidels" in the area defining the Northwest border of British India, which was largely under the influence of the Sikhs and British empires. Although he eventually died in battle, the sect he had created continued to grow and the Islamic warriors influenced by his ideals gained more power and prominence. During this period, Pashtun tribal leaders in Afghanistan fought against the British East India Company in the First Anglo-Afghan War (with the British referring to them as the Sitana Fanatics).

The term continued to be used throughout India for Muslim resistance to British colonial rule. During the Indian Rebellion of 1857, these holy warriors were said to accept any desertian Indian sepoys and recruit them into their ranks. As time went by, the sect grew ever larger until it was not only conducting bandit raids, but even controlling areas in Afghanistan.

The first known use of the word mujahideen in reference to what are today known as jihadists was supposedly in the late 19th century, in 1887, by Thomas Patrick Hughes (1838–1911).

In Central Asia from 1916 to the 1930s, Islamic guerrillas were opponents of Tsarism and Bolshevism and were called referred to by the Soviets as basmachi ('bandits'). These groups called themselves mojahed, describing themselves as standing for Islam. Other proto-mujahideen include Usman dan Fodio, Jahangir Khoja, and Muhammad Ahmed Al Mahdi.

Cold War era
In the 20th century, the term mujahideen was Afghanistan.

The modern phenomenon of jihadism that presents jihad (offensive or defensive) as the casus belli for insurgencies, guerrilla warfare, and international terrorism, originated in the 20th century and draws on early-to-mid-20th  century.

The name was most closely associated, however, with the mujahideen in Afghanistan, a coalition of guerrilla groups in Afghanistan that opposed the invading Soviet forces and eventually toppled the Afghan communist government during the Afghan War (1978–92). Rival factions thereafter fell out among themselves, precipitating the rise of the Taliban and the opposing Northern Alliance. Like the term jihad—to which it is lexicographically connected—the name has been used rather freely, both in the press and by Islamic militants themselves, and often has been used to refer to any Muslim groups engaged in hostilities with non-Muslims or even with secularized Muslim regimes.

Afghanistan

Arguably the best-known mujahideen outside the Islamic world are the various, loosely aligned Afghan opposition groups who initially rebelled against the government of the pro-Soviet Democratic Republic of Afghanistan (DRA) during the late 1970s. At the DRA's request, the Soviet Union brought forces into the country to aid the government in 1979. The mujahideen fought against Soviet and DRA troops during the Soviet–Afghan War (1979–1989). Afghanistan's resistance movement originated in chaos and, at first, regional warlords waged virtually all of its fighting locally. As warfare became more sophisticated, outside support and regional coordination grew. The basic units of mujahideen organization and action continued to reflect the highly decentralized nature of Afghan society and strong loci of competing mujahideen and Pashtun tribal groups, particularly in isolated areas among the mountains. Eventually, the seven main mujahideen parties allied as the political bloc called Islamic Unity of Afghanistan Mujahideen. However the parties were not under a single command and had ideological differences.

Many Muslims from other countries assisted the various mujahideen groups in Afghanistan. Some groups of these veterans became significant players in later conflicts in and around the Muslim world. Osama bin Laden, originally from a wealthy family in Saudi Arabia, was a prominent organizer and financier of an all-Arab Islamist group of foreign volunteers; his Maktab al-Khadamat funnelled money, arms, and Muslim fighters from around the Muslim world into Afghanistan, with the assistance and support of the Saudi and Pakistani governments. These foreign fighters became known as "Afghan Arabs" and their efforts were coordinated by Abdullah Yusuf Azzam.

Although the mujahideen were aided by the Pakistani, American, British, Chinese and Saudi governments, the mujahideen's primary source of funding was private donors and religious charities throughout the Muslim world—particularly in the Persian Gulf. Jason Burke recounts that "as little as 25 per cent of the money for the Afghan jihad was actually supplied directly by states."

Mujahideen forces caused serious casualties to the Soviet forces, and made the war very costly for the Soviet Union. In 1989 the Soviet Union withdrew its forces from Afghanistan. In February 1989 the seven Sunni mujahideen factions formed the Afghan Interim Government (AIG) in Peshawar, led by Sibghatullah Mojaddedi, as an attempt for a united front against the DRA. The AIG became a failure, partly because it could not solve the differences between the factions; partly because of limited public support as it excluded the Iran-backed Shia mujahideen factions, and the exclusion of supporters of ex-King Mohammed Zahir Shah; and the mujahideen's failure in the Battle of Jalalabad in March 1989.

In 1992 the DRA's last president, Mohammad Najibullah, was overthrown and most mujahideen factions signed the Peshawar Accords. However, the mujahideen could not establish a functional united government, and many of the larger mujahideen groups began to fight each other over power in Kabul.

After several years of devastating fighting, in a small Pashtun village, a mullah named Mohammed Omar organized a new armed movement with the backing of Pakistan. This movement became known as the Taliban ("students" in Pashto), referring to how most Taliban had grown up in refugee camps in Pakistan during the 1980s and were taught in the Saudi-backed Wahhabi madrassas, religious schools known for teaching a fundamentalist interpretation of Islam.

Cyprus 
Even before independence, the Turkish Cypriot community maintained its own paramilitary force (the Türk Mukavemet Teşkilatı, or TMT), trained and equipped by the Turkish Army. In 1967, this force was renamed the Mücahit ("Mujahideen"), and in 1975 the Mücahit was renamed the Turkish Cypriot Security Force. In 1974, Turkey led a land invasion of Northern Cyprus with the aim of protecting the Turkish minority population after a Greek-inspired coup brought a threat of union of the island with Greece. Since then there has been no major fighting on Cyprus and the nation continues to be an independent country, though strongly linked with Turkey militarily and politically.

Iran and Iraq
While more than one group in Iran has called itself mujahideen, the most famous is the People's Mujahedin of Iran (PMOI; Persian: Mojāhedin-e Khalq), an Islamic organization that advocates for the overthrow of the leadership of the Iranian Republic. The group has taken part in multiple well-known conflicts in the region, and has been at odds with the conservative government of the Islamic Republic of Iran since the 1979 Iranian Revolution.

Another mujahideen was the Mujahedin-e Islam, an Islamic party led by Ayatollah Abol-Ghasem Kashani. It formed part of the Iranian National Front during the time of Mohammed Mosaddeq's oil nationalization, but broke away from Mosaddeq over his allegedly un-Islamic policies.

Myanmar (Burma)
From 1947 to 1961, local mujahideen fought against Burmese government soldiers in an attempt to have the Mayu peninsula in northern Arakan, Burma (present-day Rakhine State, Myanmar) secede from the country, so it could be annexed by East Pakistan (present-day Bangladesh). During the late 1950s and early 1960s, the mujahideen lost most of their momentum and support, resulting in most of them surrendering to government forces.

In the 1990s, the well-armed Rohingya Solidarity Organisation was the main perpetrator of attacks on Burmese authorities positioned on the Bangladesh–Myanmar border.

Philippines

In 1969, political tensions and open hostilities developed between the Government of the Philippines and jihadist rebel groups. The Moro National Liberation Front (MNLF) was established by University of the Philippines professor Nur Misuari to condemn the killings of more than 60 Filipino Muslims and later became an aggressor against the government while the Moro Islamic Liberation Front (MILF), a splinter group from the MNLF, was established to seek an Islamic state within the Philippines and is more radical and more aggressive. 
The conflict is ongoing; casualty statistics vary for the conflict however the conservative estimates of the Uppsala Conflict Data Program indicate that at least 6,015 people were killed in armed conflict between the Government of Philippines and ASG, BIFM, MILF, and MNLF factions between 1989 and 2012. Abu Sayyaf is an Islamic separatist group in the southern Philippines, formed in 1991. The group is known for its kidnappings of Western nationals and Filipinos, for which it has received several large ransom-payments. Some Abu Sayyaf members have studied or worked in Saudi Arabia and developed relations with the mujahideen members while fighting and training in the war against the Soviet invasion of Afghanistan.

1990s
The 1990s are a transitional period between the Mujahideen outfits forming part of the proxy wars between the Cold War superpowers and the emergence of contemporary jihadism in the wake of the US "War on Terror" and the "Arab Spring".

Al-Qaeda saw its formative period during this time, and jihadism formed part of the picture in regional conflicts of the 1990s, including the Yugoslav Wars, the Somali Civil War, the First Nagorno-Karabakh War, the First Chechen War, etc.

Yugoslav Wars

During the Bosnian war 1992–1995, many foreign Muslims came to Bosnia as mujahideen. Muslims around the world who shared mujahideen beliefs and respected the author of Islamic Declaration come to the aid of fellow Muslims. Alija Izetbegovic, author of Islamic Declaration and in his younger days author of poem "To the Jihad"  was particularly happy about the presence of Mujahedeens in Bosnia and gave them full support. El Mujahid members claimed that in Bosnia they only have respect for Alija Izetbegovic and the head of the Bosnian Army Third Corps, Sakib Mahmuljin. The number of foreign Muslim volunteers in Bosnia was estimated at 4,000 in contemporary newspaper reports. Later research estimated the number to be about 400. They came from various places such as Saudi Arabia, Pakistan, Afghanistan, Jordan, Egypt, Iraq and the Palestinian Territories; to quote the summary of the International Criminal Tribunal for the former Yugoslavia judgment:

The evidence shows that foreign volunteers arrived in central Bosnia in the second half of 1992 with the aim of helping Muslims. Mostly they came from North Africa, the Near East and the Middle East. The foreign volunteers differed considerably from the local population, not only because of their physical appearance and the language they spoke, but also because of their fighting methods. The various foreign, Muslim volunteers were primarily organized into an umbrella detachment of the 7th Muslim Brigade, which was a brigade of the Army of the Republic of Bosnia and Herzegovina, based in Zenica. This independent subdivision colloquially known as El-Mudžahid, was composed exclusively of foreign nationals and not Bosnians (whereas the 7th Muslim Brigade was entirely made up of native Bosnians) and consisted of somewhere between 300 and 1,500 volunteers. Enver Hadžihasanović, Lieutenant Colonel of the Bosnian Army's 3rd Corps, appointed Mahmut Karalić (Commandant), Asim Koričić (Chief of Staff) and Amir Kubura (Assistant Chief for Operational and Curricula) to lead the group.

Some of the mujahideen funnelled arms and money into the country which Bosnia direly needed due to a United Nations-sanctioned arms embargo restricting the import of weapons into all of the republics of the Socialist Federal Republic of Yugoslavia. However, many of the mujahideen were extremely devout Muslims of the strict Salafi sect, which contrasted sharply with the relatively secular society of Bosnian Muslims. This led to friction between the mujahideen and the Bosnians.

Foreign volunteers in Bosnia have been accused of committing war crimes during the conflict. However, the ICTY has never issued indictments against mujahideen fighters. Instead, the ICTY indicted some Bosnian Army commanders on the basis of superior criminal responsibility. The ICTY acquitted Amir Kubura and Enver Hadžihasanović of the Bosnian 3rd Corps of all charges related to the incidents involving mujahideen. Furthermore, the Appeals Chamber noted that the relationship between the 3rd Corps and the El Mujahedin detachment was not one of subordination but was instead close to overt hostility since the only way to control the detachment was to attack them as if they were a distinct enemy force.

The ICTY Trial Chamber convicted Rasim Delic, the former chief of the Bosnian Army General Staff. The ICTY found that Delic had effective control over the El Mujahid Detachment. He was sentenced to three years of imprisonment for his failure to prevent or punish the cruel treatment of twelve captured Serb soldiers by the Mujahideen. Delic remained in the Detention Unit while appellate proceedings continued.

Some individuals of the Bosnian Mujahideen, such as Abdelkader Mokhtari, Fateh Kamel, and Karim Said Atmani, gained particular prominence within Bosnia as well as international attention from various foreign governments. They were all North African volunteers with well established links to Islamic Fundamentalist groups before and after the Bosnian War.

In 2015, former Human Rights Minister and Federation BiH Vice President Mirsad Kebo talked about numerous war crimes committed against Serbs by mujahideen in Bosnia and their links with current and past Muslim officials including former and current presidents of federation and presidents of parliament based on war diaries and other documented evidence. He gave evidence to the BiH federal prosecutor.

North Caucasus

The term mujahideen has often been used to refer to all separatist fighters in the case of the First and Second Chechen Wars. However, in this article, mujahideen is used to refer to the foreign, non-Caucasian fighters who joined the separatists’ cause for the sake of Jihad. They are often called Ansaar (helpers) in related literature dealing with this conflict to prevent confusion with the native fighters.

Foreign mujahideen have played a part in both Chechen wars. After the collapse of the Soviet Union and the subsequent Chechen declaration of independence, foreign fighters began entering the region and associating themselves with local rebels (most notably Shamil Basayev). Many of the foreign fighters were veterans of the Soviet–Afghan War. The mujahideen also made a significant financial contribution to the separatists’ cause; with their access to the immense wealth of Salafist charities like al-Haramein, they soon became an invaluable source of funds for the Chechen resistance, which had few resources of its own.

Most of the mujahideen decided to remain in Chechnya after the withdrawal of Russian forces. In 1999, foreign fighters played an important role in the ill-fated Chechen incursion into Dagestan, where they suffered a decisive defeat and were forced to retreat back into Chechnya. The incursion provided the new Russian government with a pretext for intervention. Russian ground forces invaded Chechnya again in 1999.

The separatists were less successful in the Second Chechen War. Russian officials claimed that the separatists had been defeated as early as 2002. The Russians also succeeded in killing the most prominent mujahideen commanders, most notably Ibn al-Khattab and Abu al-Walid.

Although the region has since been far from stable, separatist activity has decreased, though some foreign fighters remain active in Chechnya. In the last months of 2007, the influence of foreign fighters became apparent again when Dokka Umarov proclaimed the Caucasus Emirate being fought for by the Caucasian Mujahadeen, a pan-Caucasian Islamic state of which Chechnya was to be a province. This move caused a rift in the resistance movement between those supporting the Emirate and those who were in favour of preserving the Chechen Republic of Ichkeria.

Contemporary Jihadism

The neologism jihadists may correspond to the original Arabic mujahedeen.

Indian subcontinent

In India, an outfit calling itself the Indian Mujahideen came to light in 2008 with multiple large scale terror attacks. On 26 November 2008, a group calling itself the Deccan Mujahideen claimed responsibility for a string of attacks across Mumbai. The Weekly Standard claimed, "Indian intelligence believes the Indian Mujahideen is a front group created by Lashkar-e-Taiba and the Harkat-ul-Jihad-al-Islami to confuse investigators and cover the tracks of the Students Islamic Movement of India, or SIMI, a radical Islamist movement with aim to establish Islamic rule over India. In the Indian state of Jammu and Kashmir, Kashmiri Muslim separatists opposing Indian rule are often known as mujahideen. The members of the Salafi movement (within Sunni Islam) in the south Indian state of Kerala is known as "Mujahids".

Many militant groups have been involved in the war in North West Pakistan, most notably the Tehrik-i-Taliban Pakistan, Al Qaeda, and ISIS Khorasan Province. These groups refer to themselves as the mujahideen in their war against the Pakistani military and the west. Several different militant groups have also taken root in Pakistan-controlled Kashmir. Most noticeable of these groups are Lashkar-e-Taiba (LeT), Jaish-e-Mohammed (JeM), Jammu and Kashmir Liberation Front (JKLF), Hizbul Mujahideen and Harkat-ul-Mujahideen (HuM). A 1996 report by Human Rights Watch estimated the number of active mujahideen at 3,200.

In Bangladesh, the Jamaat-ul-Mujahideen was an Islamist organisation that was officially banned by the government of Bangladesh in February 2005 after attacks on NGOs. It struck back in mid-August when it detonated 500 bombs at 300 locations throughout Bangladesh.

Iraq and Syria

Iraqi insurgency

The term mujahideen is sometimes applied to fighters who joined the insurgency after the 2003 invasion of Iraq.
Some groups also use the word mujahideen in their names, like Mujahideen Shura Council and Mujahideen Army.

Following the U.S. invasion of Iraq as part of the George W. Bush administration's post 9/11 foreign policy, many foreign Mujahideen joined several Sunni militant groups resisting the U.S. occupation of Iraq. A considerable part of the insurgents did not come from Iraq but instead from many other Arab countries, notably Jordan and Saudi Arabia. Among these recruits was Abu Musab al-Zarqawi, a Jordanian national who would go on to assume the leadership of Al-Qaeda in Iraq (AQI).

Syrian civil war

Various Islamic groups, often referred to as mujahideen and jihadists, have participated in the Syrian civil war. Alawites, the sect to which Syrian President Bashar al-Assad belongs, are considered to be heretics in some Sunni Muslim circles. In this sense, radical Sunni jihadist organizations and their affiliates have been anti-Assad. Jihadist leaders and intelligence sources said foreign fighters had begun to enter Syria only in February 2012. In May 2012, Syria's U.N. envoy Bashar Ja'afari declared that dozens of foreign fighters from Libya, Tunisia, Egypt, Britain, France elsewhere had been captured or killed, and urged Saudi Arabia, Qatar and Turkey to stop "their sponsorship of the armed rebellion". Jihadist leaders and intelligence sources said foreign fighters had begun to enter Syria only in February 2012. In June, it was reported that hundreds of foreign fighters, many linked to al-Qaeda, had gone to Syria to fight against Assad. When asked if the United States would arm the opposition, Hillary Clinton expressed doubts that such weapons would be effective in the toppling of the Syrian government and may even fall into the hands of al-Qaeda or Hamas.

American officials assumed already in 2012 that Qaidat al-Jihad (a.k.a. Al-Qaeda in Iraq) has conducted bomb attacks against Syrian government forces, Iraqi Foreign Minister Hoshyar Zebari said that al-Qaeda in Iraq members have gone to Syria, where the militants previously received support and weapons from the Syrian government in order to destabilize the US occupation of Iraq. On 23 April, one of the leaders of Fatah al-Islam, Abdel Ghani Jawhar, was killed during the Battle of Al-Qusayr, after he unintentionally blew himself up while making a bomb. In July 2012, Iraq's foreign minister again warned that members of al-Qaeda in Iraq were seeking refuge in Syria and moving there to fight.

It is believed that al-Qaeda leader Ayman al-Zawahiri condemned Assad.
 
A member of the Abdullah Azzam Brigades in Lebanon admitted that his group had sent fighters to Syria. On 12 November 2018, the United States closed its financial system to an Iraqi named, Shibl Muhsin 'Ubayd Al-Zaydi and others over concerns that they were sending Iraqi fighters to Syria and financial support to other Hezbollah activities in the region.

Israel
The Mujahideen Shura Council in the Environs of Jerusalem (MSC) was designated as a Foreign Terrorist Organization (FTO) by the U.S. Department of State.

On 12 November 2018, the Department of State blacklisted the Al-Mujahidin Brigades (AMB) over its alleged Hezbollah associations, as well as Jawad Nasrallah, son of Lebanon’s Iran-backed Hezbollah leader Sayyed Hassan Nasrallah, from using the United States financial system and further naming him a terrorist associated with evidence of his involvement in attacks against Israel in the West Bank. It had been reported in Israel that the AMB was formerly linked to the Fatah rather than the Hamas organization.

Africa

Nigeria
Boko Haram has been active in Nigeria since it was founded in 2001. It existed in other forms before 2001. Although it initially limited its operations to northeast Nigeria, it has since expanded to other parts of Nigeria, and to Cameroon, Niger and Chad. Boko Haram seeks to implement sharia law across Nigeria.

Somalia

 
The currently active jihadist groups in Somalia derive from the Al-Itihaad al-Islamiya group active during the 1990s.

In July 2006, a Web-posted message purportedly written by Osama bin Laden urged Somalis to build an Islamic state in the country and warned western states that his al-Qaeda network would fight against them if they intervened there. Foreign fighters began to arrive, though there were official denials of the presence of mujahideen in the country. Even so, the threat of jihad was made openly and repeatedly in the months preceding the Battle of Baidoa. On 23 December 2006, Islamists, for the first time, called upon international fighters to join their cause. The term mujahideen is now openly used by the post-ICU resistance against the Ethiopians and the TFG.

Harakat al-Shabaab Mujahideen is said to have non-Somali foreigners in its ranks, particularly among its leadership. Fighters from the Persian Gulf and international jihadists were called to join the holy war against the Somali government and its Ethiopian allies. Though Somali Islamists did not use suicide bombing tactics before, the foreign elements of al-Shabaab are blamed for several suicide bombings. Egypt has a longstanding policy of securing the Nile River flow by destabilizing Ethiopia. Similarly, recent media reports said that Egyptian and Arab jihadists were the core members of Al-Shabaab, and were training Somalis in sophisticated weaponry and suicide bombing techniques.

Chinese ban
In April 2017, the government of China prohibited parents from choosing the name Mujahid as the given name for a child. The list included more than two dozen names and was targeted at the 10 million Uyghurs in the western region of Xinjiang.

See also
 Fedayeen
 Islamic terrorism
 Islamism
 Jihad(ism)

 List of battles of Muhammad
 Pan-Islamism
 Qutbism
 Volunteers of the Faith

References

 
Arabic words and phrases
Islamic terminology
Pan-Islamism
Democratic Republic of Afghanistan
Soviet–Afghan War
War on terror
1980s in Afghanistan
1990s in Afghanistan